Jessica Low (born 5 November 1999) is an Australian rules footballer playing for the Fremantle Football Club in the AFL Women's (AFLW). 

Low was drafted by Fremantle with their fifth selection, and 52nd overall in the 2021 AFL Women's draft. In 2019 she won the Cath Boyce Rookie of the Year award for her debut season for Claremont in the WAFL Women's league.

Low made her debut in the opening round of the 2022 AFLW season. Whilst recruited as a midfielder, Low played her first AFLW games as a defender, often on the opponent's best forward. She performed very well, keeping her direct opponents goalless during the first four games.

References

External links 

WAFL playing statistics

1999 births
Living people
Fremantle Football Club (AFLW) players
Australian rules footballers from Western Australia